Combe Hay Halt railway station was a railway station that served the village of Combe Hay, Somerset, England from 1910 to 1925 on the Bristol and North Somerset Railway.

History 
The station opened on 9 May 1910 by the Great Western Railway. It closed to passengers on 22 March 1915 as a wartime economy measure but reopened on 9 July 1923, only to close again to both passengers and goods traffic on 21 September 1925.

References

External links 

Disused railway stations in Somerset
Former Great Western Railway stations
Railway stations in Great Britain opened in 1910
Railway stations in Great Britain closed in 1915
Railway stations in Great Britain opened in 1923
Railway stations in Great Britain closed in 1925
1910 establishments in England
1925 disestablishments in England